Nikola Čvorović (Serbian Cyrillic: Никола Чворовић, born 30 January 1994) is a Serbian professional basketball player who plays for CB Marbella in the Spanish LEB Plata.

Playing career 
On October 23, 2010, Čvorović made his ABA League debut. In February 2012, Čvorović signed a four-year contract for Crvena zvezda. He spent the 2014–15 season with Crvena zvezda without playing any game. In April 2015, he is loaned to FMP for the rest of the season. In August 2015, he was waived by Zvezda.

References

External links 
 Profile at eurobasket.com
 Profile at fiba.com

1994 births
Living people
ABA League players
Basketball League of Serbia players
CB Marbella players
KK Crvena zvezda players
KK FMP players
KK Kolubara players
KK Mladost SP players
KK Radnički FMP players
KK Vršac players
KK Zdravlje players
OKK Novi Pazar players
Serbian expatriate basketball people in Italy
Serbian expatriate basketball people in Spain
Serbian men's basketball players
Small forwards